Bärnau is a town in the district of Tirschenreuth,  Bavaria, Germany. It is situated near the border with the Czech Republic, 25 km northeast of Weiden in der Oberpfalz, and 26 km southwest of Mariánské Lázně. It obtained town privileges in 1343, making it the oldest town in the district.

Culture and places of interest

Buildings 
German Button Museum
Grenzland Tower
Steinberg Church, baroque Wieskirche zum gegeißelten Heiland
Lime tree avenue to the Steinberg Church
Town centre and market place
Baroque St. Bartholomew's Church in Hohenthan
Baroque St. Michael's Church in Schwarzenbach
Castle in Thanhausen
Village chapel in Ellenfeld
Place of Meeting (Ort der Begegnung)
Festival stage and membrane roof in the abbey gardens
Bärnau-Tachov History Park

Music 
Thanhausen Brass Band
Grenzlandboum Bärnau Town and Youth Band

Sport 
Altglashütte woodland open-air pool
Bärnau swimming baths
TSV Bärnau football team
VfB Thanhausen football team
TC Bärnau tennis club
Silberhütte cross-country skiing centre
Bärnau Archery Club
KC Bärnau Bowling Club

Events 
Biennial historic market spectaculum
German - Czech festival games

References

Tirschenreuth (district)